The Abel Prize is awarded annually by the King of Norway to one or more outstanding mathematicians. It is named after the Norwegian mathematician Niels Henrik Abel (1802–1829) and directly modeled after the Nobel Prizes. It comes with a monetary award of 7.5 million Norwegian kroner (NOK; increased from 6 million NOK in 2019).

The Abel Prize's history dates back to 1899, when its establishment was proposed by the Norwegian mathematician Sophus Lie when he learned that Alfred Nobel's plans for annual prizes would not include a prize in mathematics. In 1902, King Oscar II of Sweden and Norway indicated his willingness to finance the creation of a mathematics prize to complement the Nobel Prizes, but the establishment of the prize was prevented by the dissolution of the union between Norway and Sweden in 1905. It took almost a century before the prize was finally established by the Government of Norway in 2001, and it was specifically intended "to give the mathematicians their own equivalent of a Nobel Prize." The laureates are selected by the Abel Committee, the members of whom are appointed by the Norwegian Academy of Science and Letters.

The award ceremony takes place in the aula of the University of Oslo, where the Nobel Peace Prize was awarded between 1947 and 1989. The Abel Prize board has also established an Abel symposium, administered by the Norwegian Mathematical Society, which takes place twice a year.

History
The prize was first proposed in 1899, to be part of the celebration of the 100th anniversary of Niels Henrik Abel's birth in 1802. The Norwegian mathematician Sophus Lie proposed establishing an Abel Prize when he learned that Alfred Nobel's plans for annual prizes would not include a prize in mathematics. King Oscar II was willing to finance a mathematics prize in 1902, and the mathematicians Ludwig Sylow and Carl Størmer drew up statutes and rules for the proposed prize. However, Lie's influence decreased after his death, and the dissolution of the union between Sweden and Norway in 1905 ended the first attempt to create an Abel Prize.

After interest in the concept of the prize had risen in 2001, a working group was formed to develop a proposal, which was presented to the Prime Minister of Norway in May. In August 2001, the Norwegian government announced that the prize would be awarded beginning in 2002, the two-hundredth anniversary of Abel's birth. Atle Selberg received an honorary Abel Prize in 2002, but the first actual Abel Prize was awarded in 2003.

A book series presenting Abel Prize laureates and their research was commenced in 2010. The first three volumes cover the years 2003–2007, 2008–2012, and 2013-2017 respectively.

In 2019, Karen Uhlenbeck became the first woman to win the Abel Prize, with the award committee citing "the fundamental impact of her work on analysis, geometry and mathematical physics.
The Bernt Michael Holmboe Memorial Prize was created in 2005. Named after Abel's teacher, it promotes excellence in teaching.

Selection criteria and funding 
Anyone may submit a nomination for the Abel Prize, although self-nominations are not permitted. The nominee must be alive. If the awardee dies after being declared the winner, the prize will be awarded posthumously.

The Norwegian Academy of Science and Letters declares the winner of the Abel Prize each March after recommendation by the Abel Committee, which consists of five leading mathematicians. Both Norwegians and non-Norwegians may serve on the Committee. They are elected by the Norwegian Academy of Science and Letters and nominated by the International Mathematical Union and the European Mathematical Society. , the committee is chaired by Norwegian mathematician Helge Holden and before then was headed by Hans Munthe Kaas, John Rognes, Ragni Piene, Kristian Seip, and Erling Stormer.

Funding 
The Norwegian Government gave the prize an initial funding of NOK 200 million (about €21.7 million) in 2001. Previously, the funding came from the Abel foundation, but today the prize is financed directly through the national budget.

The funding is controlled by the Board, which consists of members elected by the Norwegian Academy of Science and Letters. The current
board consists of Ingrid K. Glad (chair), Aslak Bakke Buan, Helge K. Dahle, Kristin Vinje, Cordian Riener and Gunn Elisabeth Birkelund.

Laureates

See also 

 Fields Medal
 List of prizes known as the Nobel of a field
 List of mathematics awards

References

External links 

 
 Official website of the Abel Symposium
 

2001 establishments in Norway
Academic awards
Awards established in 2001
International awards
Mathematics awards
Niels Henrik Abel
Norwegian awards